Adela Cojab Moadeb (born November 12, 1996) is a Mexican-born Israel activist, public speaker, author, and current law student at Yeshiva University's Benjamin N. Cardozo School of Law.

Early life
Cojab was born in Mexico City, Mexico. In 2001, her family moved to Deal, New Jersey, where she attended Hillel Yeshiva. Her family immigrated from Syria and Lebanon to Mexico City, where there is a large Sephardic Jewish community. Cojab's immediate family left Mexico due to the rise in organized crime of 1998–2002.

Education
Cojab attended New York University's Gallatin School of Individualized Study, where she built a concentration in Sephardic Diaspora Structures. At NYU, she served as President of Realize Israel, an Israel advocacy group, Senator for Jewish and International Students on NYU's University Senate, and Vice President of Alpha Epsilon Phi. She was also the official representative for Jewish Students at the United Nations' ECOSOC Youth forum.
As of August 2021, Cojab was enrolled at Yeshiva University's Benjamin N. Cardozo School of Law.

Cojab is fluent in four languages: Spanish, English, Hebrew, and Portuguese.

Political activism
Cojab is a speaker on Jewish rights and equality under the law. She speaks at conferences and college campuses about anti-Semitism, Zionism, and human rights. Cojab believes that all students are entitled to learn in a harassment-free environment, and works to advocate on their behalf. She has also authored and contributed to published pieces about Judaism, activism, and anti-Semitism.

Cojab's activism began with her work as a student at NYU, where she presided over Realize Israel during a string of controversial occurrences. In March 2018, the group was boycotted by 53 student organizations at New York University as part of the Boycott, Divestment, Sanctions (BDS) movement. In April of the same year, the group's Israel celebration titled Rave in the Park was disrupted by anti-Israel activists, two of whom were arrested for assault and reckless endangerment. Following NYU's decision to honor the group associated with the arrests, Cojab filed a Title VI complaint with the Department of Education against NYU for failing to protect Jewish students from harassment. The complaint gained the attention of the media, sparking similar legal complaints from Jewish students in universities nationwide.

In December 2019, Cojab was invited by President Donald J. Trump to speak about her legal complaint at the Israel American Committee's National Summit. Three days after the summit, President Trump addressed her concerns and signed an executive order officially recognizing Judaism as a protected class under Title VI of the Civil Rights Act.

Awards, honors, and media
Cojab has been designated as:
 Jewish Week 36 Under 36 of 2018
 American Sephardi Federation Broome and Allen Fellow of 2018.
 American Jewish Committee Sharon Greene Award for Campus Activism of 2019.
 JNS Top 40 Latin American Pro-Israel Advocates and Leaders of 2021.
In January 2022, Cojab was featured as an Anti-Semitism correspondent on Telemundo.

In February 2022, Cojab launched a Podcast and Youtube Talk Show called Americanish: Daughters of Diaspora.

References

1996 births
Living people
Activists against antisemitism
People from Mexico City
Mexican expatriates in the United States
Mexican people of Syrian-Jewish descent
Mexican people of Lebanese-Jewish descent
Mexican Sephardi Jews
Jewish activists
New York University Gallatin School of Individualized Study alumni